The Borroloola dtella (Gehyra borroloola) is a species of gecko in the genus Gehyra. It is endemic to Australia. It was first described in 1983 by Max King.

References

Gehyra
Reptiles described in 1983
Geckos of Australia